The Scientific Supercake L.P. is the debut album of godheadSilo. It was released in 1994 by Kill Rock Stars.

Critical reception
Andrew Earles, in Gimme Indie Rock: 500 Essential American Underground Rock Albums 1981-1996, wrote that the album "literally held the potential to destroy speakers and stereo systems not ready for the absurdly low and nasty frequencies found in some of [the] songs."

Track listing

Personnel 

godheadSilo
 Dan Haugh – drums
 Mike Kunka – bass guitar

Technical personnel
 godheadSilo – mixing
 Tim Green – recording, mixing
 Michael Lastra – recording
 Joe Preston – recording

Release history

References

External links 
 

1994 debut albums
GodheadSilo albums
Kill Rock Stars albums